Gununah Parish located at  is a remote rural locality and civil parish of Evelyn County, New South Wales in far northwest New South Wales. located at 29°50′23″S 141°08′05″E. on the border with South Australia.

Geography
The geography of the Parish is mostly the flat, arid landscape of the Channel Country. The parish has a Köppen climate classification of BWh (Hot desert). The nearest town is Tibooburra to the north, which is on the Silver City Highway and lies south of the Sturt National Park. The Parish itself is on the Silver City Highway where it meets Mount Brown Creek. Mount Brown Creek enters Bullea Lake some kilometers to the south.

References

Parishes of Evelyn County
Localities in New South Wales